Hannassa is a proto-Somali historic town in southern Somalia.

History

Built on a promontory, Hanassa contains ruins of houses with archways and courtyards. It also features sites with pillar tombs, including a rare octagonal tomb. Additionally, excavations here have retrieved sherds of celadon and undecorated pottery. Amongst the ruins is a small mosque, with a well-preserved mihrab overlooking the Indian Ocean. It's believed to date back to the Ajuran Empire.

See also
Essina
Gondershe
Mosylon
Miandi
Nikon (Somalia)
Sarapion

References

Archaeological sites in Somalia
Former populated places in Somalia
Ajuran Sultanate
Archaeological sites of Eastern Africa